WEMR may refer to:

 WEMR-LP, a low-power radio station (92.7 FM) licensed to serve Chambersburg, Pennsylvania, United States
 WLEJ-FM (98.7 FM) in Pleasant Gap, Pennsylvania
 WGMM (1460 AM) in Tunkhannock, Pennsylvania